Seward County (standard abbreviation: SW) is a county of the U.S. state of Kansas. As of the 2020 census, the county population was 21,964. The largest city and county seat is Liberal. The county was formed on March 20, 1873 and named after William Henry Seward, an American politician and Secretary of State under Abraham Lincoln and Andrew Johnson.

Geography
It borders Oklahoma to the south.

Adjacent counties
 Haskell County (north)
 Meade County (east)
 Beaver County, Oklahoma (southeast)
 Texas County, Oklahoma (southwest)
 Stevens County (west)

Demographics

The Liberal, KS Micropolitan Statistical Area includes all of Seward County.

As of the census of 2000, there were 22,510 people, 7,419 households, and 5,504 families residing in the county. The population density was 35 people per square mile (14/km2). There were 8,027 housing units at an average density of 13 per square mile (5/km2). The racial makeup of the county was 65.44% White, 3.78% Black or African American, 0.77% Native American, 2.86% Asian, 0.06% Pacific Islander, 23.81% from other races, and 3.27% from two or more races. 42.14% of the population were Hispanic or Latino of any race.

There were 7,419 households, out of which 43.50% had children under the age of 18 living with them, 59.60% were married couples living together, 10.00% had a female householder with no husband present, and 25.80% were non-families. 20.60% of all households were made up of individuals, and 7.80% had someone living alone who was 65 years of age or older. The average household size was 2.98 and the average family size was 3.46.

In the county, the population was spread out, with 32.00% under the age of 18, 11.70% from 18 to 24, 30.50% from 25 to 44, 16.90% from 45 to 64, and 8.90% who were 65 years of age or older. The median age was 29 years. For every 100 females, there were 105.30 males. For every 100 females age 18 and over, there were 103.70 males.

The median income for a household in the county was $36,752, and the median income for a family was $41,134. Males had a median income of $29,765 versus $21,889 for females. The per capita income for the county was $15,059. About 13.90% of families and 16.90% of the population were below the poverty line, including 21.00% of those under age 18 and 7.30% of those age 65 or over.

Government

Presidential elections

Seward County has voted Republican since 1940. The last time Seward County voted for a Democratic candidate for President was when it favored incumbent Democrat Franklin D. Roosevelt in 1936 over Kansas Governor Alf Landon. In the Kansas Senate it is currently represented by Republican Garrett Love. In the Kansas House of Representatives it is represented by Republicans Bill Light and Carl Holmes.

In 2016, Hillary Clinton became the first Democrat to break 30% in Seward County since Jimmy Carter in 1976. Four years later, Democrat Joe Biden would receive 34.6% of the vote, the highest share for a Democrat since Lyndon B. Johnson received 46.1% in Seward County in 1964.

Laws
Following amendment to the Kansas Constitution in 1986, the county remained a prohibition, or "dry", county until 1996, when voters approved the sale of alcoholic liquor by the individual drink with a 30% food sales requirement.

Education

Unified school districts
 Liberal USD 480
 Kismet-Plains USD 483

Communities

Cities
 Kismet
 Liberal

Unincorporated communities
 Hayne

Townships
Seward County is divided into three townships.  The city of Liberal is considered governmentally independent and is excluded from the census figures for the townships.  In the following table, the population center is the largest city (or cities) included in that township's population total, if it is of a significant size.

See also

 Golden Triangle of Meat-packing

References

Notes

Further reading

External links

County
 
 Seward County - Directory of Public Officials
 Seward County Historical Society

Historical railroad trestle - "Samson of the Cimarron"
 Samson of the Cimarron, kansastravel.org
 Mighty Samson Bridge nears 73rd birthday , leaderandtimes.com
 Sampson of the Cimarron history, rits.org

Maps
 Seward County Maps: Current, Historic, KDOT
 Kansas Highway Maps: Current, Historic, KDOT
 Kansas Railroad Maps: Current, 1996, 1915, KDOT and Kansas Historical Society

 
Kansas counties
1873 establishments in Kansas
Populated places established in 1873